Nahl is a surname. Notable people with the surname include:

 Charles Christian Nahl (1818–1878), German-born American painter
 Hugo Wilhelm Arthur Nahl (1833–1889), German-born American painter
 Johann August Nahl (1710–1781), German sculptor and stuccoist
 Perham Wilhelm Nahl (1869–1935), American printmaker, painter, illustrator and an arts educator